The Infrastructure Investment and Jobs Act (IIJA), most commonly known as the Bipartisan Infrastructure Bill and originally in the House as the INVEST in America Act (H.R. 3684), is a United States federal statute enacted by the 117th United States Congress and signed into law by President Joe Biden on November 15, 2021.

The act was initially a  infrastructure package that included provisions related to federal-aid highway, transit, highway safety, motor carrier, research, hazardous materials and rail programs of the Department of Transportation. After congressional negotiations, it was amended and renamed to the Infrastructure Investment and Jobs Act to include funding for broadband access, clean water and electric grid renewal in addition to the transportation and road proposals of the original House bill. This amended version included approximately $1.2 trillion in spending, with $550 billion being newly authorized spending on top of what Congress was planning to authorize regularly.

The amended bill was passed 69–30 by the Senate on August 10, 2021. On November 5, it was passed 228–206 by the House, and ten days later was signed into law by President Biden.

Background 

On March 31, 2021, President Joe Biden unveiled his $2.3 trillion American Jobs Plan (which, when combined with the American Families Plan, amounted to $4 trillion in infrastructure spending), pitched by him as "a transformative effort to overhaul the nation's economy". The detailed plan aimed to create millions of jobs, bolster labor unions, expand labor protections, and address climate change.

Legislative history

Senate passage 
In mid-April 2021, Republican lawmakers offered a $568 billion counterproposal to the American Jobs Plan. On May 9, Senate Minority Leader Mitch McConnell said it should cost no more than $800 billion. On May 21, the administration reduced the price tag to $1.7 trillion, which was quickly rejected by Republicans. A day later, a bipartisan group within the Senate Environment and Public Works Committee announced that they had reached a deal for $304 billion in funding for U.S. highway funding. This was approved unanimously by the committee on May 26. On June 4, House Transportation and Infrastructure Committee Chair Peter DeFazio announced a $547 billion plan, called the INVEST in America Act, which would address parts of the American Jobs Plan. On July 1, the House passed an amended $715 billion infrastructure bill focused on land transportation and water.

On May 27, Republican senator Shelley Moore Capito presented a $928 billion plan, and on June 4, increased it by about $50 billion; this was quickly rejected by the Biden administration. On June 8, the administration shifted its focus to a bipartisan group of 20 senators, which had been working on a package tentatively priced around $900 billion. On June 10, a bipartisan group of 10 senators reached a deal costing $974 billion over five years; or about $1.2 trillion if stretched over eight years. On June 16, the plan was endorsed by a bipartisan group of 21 senators. On June 24, the bipartisan group met with the president and reached a compromise deal costing $1.2 trillion over eight years, which focuses on physical infrastructure (notably roads, bridges, railways, water, sewage, broadband, electric vehicles). This was planned to be paid for through reinforced Internal Revenue Service (IRS) collection, unspent COVID-19 relief funds, and other sources. By July 2021, the IRS portion of the funding had reportedly been scrapped. Biden stipulated that a separate "human infrastructure" bill (notably child care, home care, and climate change)later known as the Build Back Better Actmust also pass, whether through bipartisanship or reconciliation, but later walked back this position. House Speaker Nancy Pelosi similarly stated that the House would not vote on the physical infrastructure bill until the larger bill passes in the Senate, despite the fact that reconciliation overrides much of the obstructive power of the filibuster.

White House officials stated on July 7 that legislative text was nearing completion. On July 14, the Senate Energy and Natural Resources Committee advanced an energy bill expected to be included in the bipartisan package. On July 21, Senate Majority Leader Charles Schumer put forward a "shell bill" for a vote to kick off debate in the Senate, intending to add the bipartisan text via an amendment. On July 25, Republican senator Rob Portman stated that an agreement was "about 90%" complete, with mass transit being one remaining point of contention. On July 30, Portman stated that this had been resolved. On July 28, Senator Kyrsten Sinema stated that she did not support a reconciliation bill costing $3.5 trillion, breaking the stalemate and allowing the bipartisan bill to move forward. That day, the Senate voted 67–32 to advance the bill, and on July 30, voted 66–28 to proceed to its consideration. The legislation text was completed and substituted into the bill on August 1. On August 5, Schumer moved to truncate debate on the legislation, setting up a procedural vote on August 7, which passed 67–27. Fifteen or more amendments were expected to receive votes through the weekend. On August 10, the bill was passed by the Senate 69–30. It sets aside $550 billion in new spending.
A procedural vote on a House rule concerning passing both bills passed along party lines on August 24.

House passage 

In early August, nine moderate Democrats called for an immediate House vote on the bill, citing a desire not to lose the momentum from the Senate passage of the bill. They committed to voting against taking up the reconciliation resolution until there was a vote on the bipartisan infrastructure bill. While both Biden and House Speaker Nancy Pelosi have reversed earlier positions to support passing the bipartisan bill separately, progressives including Congressional Progressive Caucus chairwoman Pramila Jayapal and Senator Bernie Sanders maintained that it be utilized as leverage to pass the most expensive reconciliation bill possible. The lack of a deal caused a late September House vote to be postponed. On October 2, Pelosi set a new deadline of October 31. By October 28, Jayapal and other progressive leaders indicated that they were willing to vote on the bill separately, but Sanders and others opposed this. On October 31, a majority of progressives signaled that they would support both bills.

Votes on both bills were considered on November 5, but the hesitation of several moderates to pass the reconciliation bill before it could be scored by the Congressional Budget Office made passing the bipartisan bill unlikely.  Negotiations between centrist and progressive Democrats concluded with the centrists committing to passing the Build Back Better Act. The bill ultimately went to a vote, as did a rule to vote on the larger bill once it was scored, passing 228–206; 13 Republicans joined all but six Democrats (members of "the Squad") in supporting the legislation. The six Democrats who voted 'No' stated that their opposition was because the legislation had been decoupled from the social-safety net provisions of the Build Back Better bill. Biden signed the bill into law at a signing ceremony on November 15.

Provisions

The final version restores the Superfund excise tax on certain chemicals which expired in 1995.

House version 
The following is the bill summary authorized by the Congressional Research Service (CRS) for the INVEST in America Act, the original version which passed the House on July 1, 2021:
 "extends FY2021 enacted levels through FY2022 for federal-aid highway, transit, and safety programs;
 reauthorizes for FY2023-FY2026 several surface transportation programs, including the federal-aid highway program, transit programs, highway safety, motor carrier safety, and rail programs;
 addresses climate change, including strategies to reduce the climate change impacts of the surface transportation system and a vulnerability assessment to identify opportunities to enhance the resilience of the surface transportation system and ensure the efficient use of federal resources;
 revises Buy America Act procurement requirements for highways, mass transit, and rail;
 establishes a rural bridge rebuilding program to improve the safety and state of good repair of bridges in rural communities;
 implements new safety requirements across all transportation modes; and
 directs the Department of Transportation to establish a pilot program to demonstrate a national motor vehicle per-mile user fee to restore and maintain the long-term solvency of the Highway Trust Fund and achieve and maintain a state of good repair in the surface transportation system."

The specific amounts in surface transportation spending were $343 billion for roads, highways, bridges and motor safety, $109 billion for transit, and $95 billion for rail. Provisions of the bill incentivized prioritizing maintenance and repair spending over spending on new infrastructure, collecting data on reductions in vehicle miles traveled through transit-oriented development, and lowering speed limits to increase road safety and encourage building complete streets. The Senate version, and the final bill, de-emphasized these incentives.

Senate version 

According to NPR, the version which passed the Senate on July 28 is set to include:

 $110 billion for roads, bridges and other major projects;
 $11 billion for transportation safety programs;
 $39 billion to modernize transit and improve accessibility;
 $66 billion for passenger and freight rail;
 $7.5 billion to build a national network of electric vehicle chargers;
 $73 billion in power infrastructure and clean energy transmission
 $65 billion for broadband development.

The bill would also make the Minority Business Development Agency a permanent agency.

Impact on environment and climate 
A report written by the REPEAT project, said the Infrastructure Investment and Jobs Act alone will make only a small reduction in emissions, but as they say: "We lack modeling capabilities to reflect the net effect of surface transportation investments in highways (which tend to increase on-road vehicle and freight miles traveled) and rail and public transit (which tend to reduce on-road vehicle and freight miles traveled). These significant programs are therefore not modeled in this analysis, an important limitation of our assessment of the Infrastructure Investment and Jobs Act".

The bill includes the largest federal investment in public transit in history. The bill includes spending figures of $105 billion dollars in public transport. It also spends $110 billion on fixing roads and bridges and includes measures for climate change mitigation and improving access for cyclists and pedestrians. Increasing use of public transport and related transit-oriented development can reduce transportation emissions in human settlements by 78% and overall US emissions by 15%. 

The bill includes spending $21 billion for environmental projects, $50 billion for water storage, and $15 billion for electric vehicles. $73 billion will be spent on power infrastructure including the electrical grid's adjustment to renewable energy. It also gives $4.7 billion to cap orphan wells abandoned by oil and gas companies and $1 billion to better connect neighborhoods separated by transport infrastructure as part of environmental justice efforts. This $1 billion will be spent through the Reconnecting Communities Pilot (RCP) discretionary grant program that, among other priorities, promotes: "New or improved, affordable transportation options to increase safe mobility and connectivity for all, including for people with disabilities, through lower-carbon travel like walking, cycling, rolling, and transit that reduce greenhouse gas emissions and promote active travel.

Highway removal and complete streets

The law includes $1 billion over five years for Reconnecting Communities planning and construction grants, the first of which were awarded in February 2023.

Reactions

Congress 
Republican senators balked at Biden's tandem plan to pass both a bipartisan plan and a separate Democratic-supported reconciliation bill. McConnell criticized Biden for "caving" to his own party by issuing an "ultimatum" that he would not sign the bipartisan bill without a separate reconciliation package. After Biden walked back his comments, Republican senators restated their confidence in the bipartisan bill. A Yahoo! News/YouGov poll conducted in late June found that 60% of Republican voters favored the plan.

On June 28, 2021, Sunrise Movement and several progressive representatives performed a protest at the White House in criticism of the size and scope of Biden's Civilian Climate Corps. Several protesters were arrested for blocking White House entrances.

On July 6, the 58-member bipartisan House Problem Solvers Caucus stated their support for the bipartisan bill and called for an expeditious and independent House vote. On July 21, a group of 65 former governors and mayors endorsed the plan.

Ahead of a procedural vote on August 7, former president Donald Trump attacked the bill and said he would support Republican primary challengers of senators who vote for it. He reiterated his criticisms following the bill's passage by Congress.

Following the bill's passage by Congress in November, Trump criticized it as containing "only 11% for real Infrastructure", calling it "the Elect Democrats in 2022/24 Act", and attacked Republicans who had supported it, saying in particular that McConnell had lent "lifelines to those who are destroying" the country. Various House Republicans also criticized the 13 Republican representatives who voted for the bill. Lauren Boebert described them as "RINOS" (Republican in Name Only). Mary Miller called them "spineless" and said they helped enact a "socialist takeover". Marjorie Taylor Greene called them "traitors" and "American job & energy killers", who "are China-First and America-Last", because they "agree with Globalist Joe [Biden] that America must depend on China to drive" electric vehicles. Gary Palmer was criticized for touting funding for the Birmingham Northern Beltline that he added to the bill, while neglecting to mention that he voted against the final bill. Paul Gosar was also criticized for taking credit for the bill's funding for Kingman Airport despite voting against it. Several Republican governors who condemned the bill, including Kristi Noem of South Dakota and Greg Gianforte of Montana, accepted the funding and directed it to various programs.

Others 
On June 22, the U.S. Chamber of Commerce, Business Roundtable and No Labels made a joint statement urging the president to consider a bipartisan bill. The former two groups have lobbied for the plan not to raise corporate taxes, and to instead impose user fees and borrow from other federal funds. Senator Bernie Sanders has stated that he would not support paying for the bill via a proposed gas tax or a surcharge on electric vehicles.

According to an early August Harvard CAPS-Harris Poll survey, about 72% of voters support the bill.

On September 24, leaders from the U.S. Conference of Mayors, the National League of Cities, the National Urban League, and other Black American advocacy groups signaled their support for the bill.

On September 25, Peter J. Wallison authored an opinion piece for The Hill in which he argued that Republicans should try to pass the bipartisan bill to prevent it from being used as further leverage to pass the reconciliation bill. Subsequently, Republican House leaders formally opposed the bipartisan bill.

"Historians, economists and engineers interviewed by The Associated Press welcomed Biden's efforts. But they stressed that $1 trillion was not nearly enough to overcome the government's failure for decades to maintain and upgrade the country's infrastructure."

The think tank Transportation for America praised the House version of the bill, but heavily criticized the Senate version for its shortcomings on safety, climate resilience, long-term transit and rail funding and transit-oriented development, and maintenance spending, though it later noted that the final version that became law made small steps to address them.

The nuclear industry favored the legislation as it signaled continued federal government support.

Polling from Third Way and Impact Research released in July 2022 showed that only 24% of voters were aware the bill was signed into law, despite House Democrats holding over 1,000 events to promote it.

See also
 CHIPS and Science Act and Inflation Reduction Act of 2022, two other major industrial policy bills signed by Biden

Notes

References

External links
 Infrastructure Investment and Jobs Act as amended (PDF/details) in the GPO Statute Compilations collection
 Infrastructure Investment and Jobs Act as enacted (PDF/details) in the US Statutes at Large
 H.R.3684 - Infrastructure Investment and Jobs Act bill information on Congress.gov

Acts of the 117th United States Congress
Presidency of Joe Biden